This list of the tallest buildings in Nashville ranks skyscrapers in Nashville, in the U.S. state of Tennessee, by height. The tallest building in the city and the state is the AT&T Building, which rises  in downtown Nashville and was completed in 1994. The second-tallest skyscraper in the city is the Four Seasons Hotel and Residences, which rises .

High-rise buildings first appeared in Nashville with the construction of the First National Bank Building, now the Downtown Courtyard Hotel, in 1905; this building rises  and 12 floors. As of December 2022, there are 188 completed high-rises in the city. Twenty high-rises have been completed in the past three years, with another twenty currently in construction, fifteen approved, and another 25 high-rises approved and proposed. Nashville has demonstrated quick approval of many major projects, such as One22One. It was announced in February 2019, with the previous building demolished and ground breaking expected in September 2019. As of July 2022, there are 45 cranes in Downtown and Metro Nashville

Tallest buildings
This list ranks Nashville skyscrapers completed or structurally topped out that stand at least , based on standard height measurement. There are at least 20 additional high rises in Nashville between 236 feet and 299 feet tall not shown here.

Tallest under construction
Buildings approved that are currently under construction, in site prep, or demolition phase. Buildings listed are planned to rise above .

Tallest proposed or pending construction 
These buildings have either been issued permits and approved, or buildings that are in its planning stage that stand 300 feet (91 m) using standard measurement.

Timeline of tallest buildings
This lists buildings that once held the title of tallest building in Nashville. The first skyscraper in the city was the First National Bank Building, now the Courtyard Hotel, from 1905 until 1908.

References
General

Specific

 
Nashville
Tallest in Nashville
Tallest